Darya Vitalyevna Pishchalnikova (born 19 July 1985 in Astrakhan) is a female discus thrower from Russia. Pishchalnikova is the sister of Bogdan Pishchalnikov and Kirill Pishchalnikov.

Career
Pishchalnikova rose through the ranks as a young athlete, winning the silver medal in the discus at the 2001 World Youth Championships in Athletics, then repeating that feat at the World Junior Championships in 2004. She established herself as one of the top women's throwers at the 2006 European Athletics Championships, taking the gold medal with a throw of 65.55 metres, which remains her personal best.

She set a personal best throw of 65.78 metres when she won the silver medal at the 2007 World Championships in Osaka, but that throw was to be subsequently discredited. She was selected to represent Russia at the 2008 Summer Olympics in Beijing, but on 31 July, she was suspended from competition due to doping test irregularities, along with several other high-profile Russian female athletes. On 20 October 2008, it was announced that Pishchalnikova was one of seven Russian athletes receiving a two-year doping ban for manipulating drug samples.

She returned to competition in 2011 and finished eleventh at the World Championships in Daegu that year. She took second place at the 2012 European Cup Winter Throwing, then had a personal best throw of 67.00 m in Adler in May. At the Prefontaine Classic Diamond League meeting she was runner-up to Sandra Perković. She won the Russian Championships with a throw of 70.69 m – the best performance in the event since 1992.

Pishchalnikova participated in the 2012 Olympics and was awarded a silver medal. However, she tested positive for the anabolic steroid oxandrolone in the samples taken in May 2012. On April, 2013 she was banned by the Russian Athletics Federation for ten years, and her results from May 2012 were annulled, meaning she was set on track to lose her Olympic medal. According to the New York Times, she was a whistleblower who sent the World Anti-Doping Agency (WADA) a December 2012 email detailing state-run doping programs in which Russian athletes had to participate; her ban by the Russian Athletics Federation was likely in retaliation.

Achievements

References

External links 

 
 
 

1985 births
Living people
Sportspeople from Astrakhan
Russian female discus throwers
Olympic athletes of Russia
Russian sportspeople in doping cases
Doping cases in athletics
Athletes (track and field) at the 2012 Summer Olympics
European Athletics Championships medalists
Competitors stripped of Summer Olympics medals
Athletes stripped of World Athletics Championships medals
Competitors at the 2005 Summer Universiade